Kittiphong Pluemjai (born 29 March 1993) is a Thai-Norwegian footballer who plays as a striker.

Career
He played junior football for SK Brann, but never broke into the senior team, and went on loan to Nest-Sotra. He then tried his luck in Thailand with Buriram United in Thai Premier League and AFC Champions League. He joined Buriram United in December 2013, when he was on trial at the club during his holiday in Thailand.

He was training with Thailand`s National team in November 2011.

Pluemjai later played for clubs including Regional League Division 2 club Phrae United. In 2016, he returned to Norway with Nest-Sotra.

References

External links
Profile at eurosport.com
Profile at fotball.no
https://us.soccerway.com/players/kittiphong-pluemjai/232575/
 Kittiphong Pluemjai at EnglishUDFC.com

1993 births
Living people
Thai emigrants to Norway
Kittiphong Pluemjai
Kittiphong Pluemjai
Association football forwards
SK Brann players
Nest-Sotra Fotball players
Kittiphong Pluemjai
Kittiphong Pluemjai
Kittiphong Pluemjai
Kittiphong Pluemjai
Kittiphong Pluemjai
Thai expatriate sportspeople in Norway
Thai expatriate sportspeople in Malaysia